Wisp or WISP may refer to:

Acronyms
 Wartime Information Security Program
 WISP (particle physics), Weakly Interacting Sub-eV Particle or Weakly Interacting Slender Particle in hypothetical quantum mechanics
 WISP1, WISP2, and WISP3, the human genes encoding the WNT1 Inducible Signaling Pathway proteins 1, 2, and 3
 Wireless Internet service provider, is an Internet Service Provider (ISP) that provides connectivity via WLAN
 Wireless identification and sensing platform (WISP) is a software-configurable passive UHF RFID tag

Mythology and fiction
 Night wisp, a fictional creature in the Sword of Truth series by Terry Goodkind
 Wisp, the birth name of a fictional young orphan girl who would later become known as Rainbow Brite
 Wisp is a nature spirit associated with the Night Elf race in the MMORPG World of Warcraft
 Wisp (Sonic), the alien race in the Sonic the Hedgehog games

Other uses
 WISP (AM), a radio station (1570 AM) licensed to Doylestown, Pennsylvania, United States
 Wisp (musician), an electronic artist signed to Rephlex Records
 Wisp Ski Resort, in western Maryland
 Colgate Wisp, a single-use toothbrush
 Agriocnemis, a genus of damselfly commonly known as a wisp

See also
 Will-o'-the-wisp (disambiguation)